Percy France (August 15, 1928 – January 4, 1992) was an American jazz tenor saxophonist. France gained particular recognition during the 1950s and early 1960s as a sideman for Jimmy Smith, Freddie Roach and Bill Doggett and was considered by his contemporary, Sonny Rollins, as "one of the tenor players that I had to compete with when I was making my reputation as a young saxophonist. He was probably the best player around at that time; I never could beat him."

Biography
Percy France was born and raised in New York City, living in the prominent black communities of San Juan Hill and Sugar Hill, and attended Benjamin Franklin High School alongside Sonny Rollins. France studied piano and clarinet from an early age. Demonstrating particular aptitude as a woodwind player, France moved on to tenor saxophone at the age of 13.

Though France's recording career began in 1949 as a sideman for singer Betty Mays, it was not until 1952 that he became a distinctive saxophone addition to Bill Doggett's organ group. The Bill Doggett group was among the most popular R&B acts of the era but it was also a vehicle for interpretations of popular jazz standards and ballads. Reflecting on his time performing with France in 1992, Doggett praised his "unique ability to be able to build a solo. He would start off simply... and pick you up and carry you with him with his solos, as a singer would do, just lift you, and you don't know what's happening to you, but you're enjoying it."

After leaving Bill Doggett's group France began a brief association with Blue Note Records, featuring on sessions including Jimmy Smith's Home Cookin' album and Down to Earth by Freddie Roach. France also performed with Sir Charles Thompson and appeared on Thompson's And The Swing Organ album.

France's career tapered off in the 1960s but he returned to active performing in his native New York City in the 1970s and 1980s, performing at The West End Bar and other clubs as leader of his own groups and with others including Sammy Price's Two-Tenor Boogie, Joe Albany's New Yorkers and Jo Jones and Friends.

France toured Europe in the winter of 1982 and 1983 with the Oliver Jackson Trio, and the group recorded an album for the French Black & Blue label in September 1982.  France replaced Buddy Tate in Sammy Price's Two-Tenor Boogie in 1982 and stayed with Price thru April 1990, when a performance was broadcast by WKCR-FM. In 1987 the group performed at the Bern Jazz Festival.

In 1988, at the recommendation of jazz disc jockey and historian Phil Schaap, France was hired by Simon & Schuster to improvise saxophone interludes for a series of Mickey Spillane's Mike Hammer books-on-tape which were narrated by Stacy Keach.

France stopped performing in New York City in 1990 after receiving a cancer diagnosis. France was fatally struck by a vehicle as a pedestrian in 1992 and died at the age of 63.

Discography

As leader
 I Should Care (Endgame Records, 2000)

As sideman
with Betti Mays And Her Swingtet
 Mays' Haze / Slow Rock (Regal Records, 1949)
with The "5" Royales
 Dedicated to You (King Records, 1957) 
with Bill Doggett
 Dance Awhile with Doggett (King Records, 1958)
 The Many Moods of Bill Doggett (King Records, 1961)
 Leaps and Bounds (Charly R&B, 1952-1959 [rel. 1991])
with Sir Charles Thompson

 Sir Charles Thompson and The Swing Organ (Columbia, 1959 [rel. 1960])

with Jimmy Smith
 Home Cookin' (Blue Note, 1959 [rel. 1961]) 
with Freddie Roach
 Down to Earth (Blue Note, 1962)
with Oliver Jackson

 Oliver Jackson Presents Le Quartet (Black & Blue, 1982 [rel. 1983])

with Lance Hayward
 Live at Eddie Condon's (Town Crier Recordings, 1984)
 That's All! (Town Crier Recordings, 1984)
 A Closer Walk (Town Crier Recordings, 1992)

References

1928 births
1992 deaths
20th-century American male musicians
20th-century American saxophonists
American jazz tenor saxophonists
American male jazz musicians
American male saxophonists
Blue Note Records artists
Hard bop saxophonists
Jazz musicians from New York (state)
Musicians from New York City
People from Manhattan
Road incident deaths in New York City
Soul-jazz saxophonists